Peggy Wilson (born September 8, 1945) is a former Republican member of the Alaska House of Representatives, who represented the 2nd District from 2001 through 2013 and the 33rd district from 2013 to 2015. She had also served as the majority leader. She had previously served for five years in the North Carolina House of Representatives. Wilson served as Chair of the Transportation Committee, and was a member of the Education Committee, Resources Committee, State Affairs Committee, and the Legislative Council. She also served on the Education & Early Development, Labor & Workforce Development, and Transportation & Public Facilities Finance Subcommittees, for the 26th Legislature. She is also a registered nurse.

Personal life
Representative Wilson has a husband (Woody), three children (Tad, Gina and Chris), eight grandchildren and five great-grandchildren. Peggy Wilson received her Associate of Science in Nursing from Kirkwood Community College in 1973, received her EMT training from the University of Alaska, and graduated from the University of North Carolina at Chapel Hill in Nursing.

References

External links
 Alaska State Legislature Biography
 Project Vote Smart profile
 Peggy Wilson at 100 Years of Alaska's Legislature

|-

|-

|-

1945 births
American nurses
American women nurses
Living people
Republican Party members of the Alaska House of Representatives
Members of the North Carolina House of Representatives
People from Wrangell, Alaska
UNC School of Nursing alumni
Women state legislators in Alaska
Women state legislators in North Carolina
21st-century American politicians
21st-century American women politicians